Unthank is a hamlet and former civil parish, now in the parish of Alnham in Northumberland, England. In 1951 the parish had a population of 11.

History 
It is first mentioned in writing as Unthanc in 1207, and in its current orthography in 1242. Unthank is a deserted medieval village that was last referred to in documents in 1726. Unthank was a township in Alnham parish. From 1866 Unthank was a civil parish in its own right until it was merged with Alnham on 1 April 1955.

Governance 
Unthank is in the parliamentary constituency of Berwick-upon-Tweed.

References

Hamlets in Northumberland
Former civil parishes in Northumberland